Wide Open is the second studio album by Canadian band Weaves. It was released on October 6, 2017 through Kanine Records. The album was a shortlisted finalist for the 2018 Polaris Music Prize.

Accolades

Track listing

References

2017 albums
Kanine Records albums
Weaves (band) albums